Draba corymbosa is a species of flowering plant belonging to the family Brassicaceae.

It is native to Subarctic.

Synonyms:
 Draba bellii Holm

References

corymbosa